Matsumyia  is a genus of hoverfly in the family Syrphidae.

Species
Matsumyia bimaculata Huo & Ren, 2006
Matsumyia cyaniventris (Sack, 1926)
Matsumyia dentata (Brunetti, 1908)
Matsumyia japonica (Shiraki, 1930)
Matsumyia jesoensis (Matsumura, 1911)
Matsumyia nigrofacies Shiraki, 1949
Matsumyia setosa (Shiraki, 1930)
Matsumyia trifasciata (Shiraki, 1930)
Matsumyia trilineata (Hull, 1943)
Matsumyia zibaiensis Huo & Ren, 2006

References

Eristalinae
Hoverfly genera
Diptera of Asia